Vikas Jhorar is an Indian cricketer. He made his List A debut for Rajasthan in the 2017–18 Vijay Hazare Trophy on 9 February 2018.

References

External links
 

1997 births
Living people
Indian cricketers
Place of birth missing (living people)
Rajasthan cricketers